The people of Mauritania are nearly all adherents of Sunni Islam of Maliki school of jurisprudence, influenced with Sufism. Mauritania is a country in Africa, bordering Algeria, Mali, Senegal, and the Western Sahara (currently controlled by Morocco). Officially, 100% of the Mauritanian citizens are Muslim, although there is a small community of Christians, mainly of foreign nationality. The two largest Sufi Muslim tariqas in Mauritania are Tijaniyyah and Qadiriyya. Because of the ethnic and tribal divisions in the country, religion is seen by the government as essential for national unity.

History

It was trade with Muslim merchants that brought Islam into the region, in the 8th century.

The Almoravid dynasty rose to power in the western Maghreb during the 11th century, and prosletyzed Islam throughout the region. Members of the Gadala Berbers brought back the theologian Abdallah ibn Yasin from Mecca in 1035, where they traveled for the hajj, to expunge the paganism still prevalent in Mauritania. Although Islam had existed in the region prior to the Almoravids, Almoravid rule accelerated the spread of Islam and removed animist influences on local Islamic practices. Ibn Yasin's strict interpretation of Islam alienated many of the Berbers, and the theologian was expelled. Undaunted, he accumulated a devoted following of loyal believers and an army, the foundation of the Almoravid dynasty. ibn Yasin's military expansion converted tribe members of the Gadala, Lemtuma, and Messufa Berbers of the region to Islam. The capture of Sijilmasa and Aoudaghost, important cities in the Trans-Saharan trade, allowed them to dominate the trade routes of the Sahara. The Almoravids converted the Berbers inhabiting modern-day Mauritania to the Maliki school of Sunni Islam, which remains dominant in Mauritania to this day.

ibn Yasin was succeeded by Abu Bakr ibn Umar, a chieftain of the Lamtuna Berbers. Fighting between the Lemtuma and Messufa led ibn Umar to declare a holy war against the Ghana Empire to unify the tribes against a common enemy. The war, which lasted for fourteen years, spread Islam to the members of the Soninke people, founders of Ghana.  The political influence of the Almoravids waned as the dynasty declined, but Islamic adherence was firmly cemented in the country.

The political influence of the Kunta tribe between the 16th and 18th centuries bolstered the popularity of Qadiri Sufism in the region. Between the 16th and 18th centuries, declaration of jihads by Muslim theologians pushed for the establishment of Islamic governance in West Africa. In the 17th century, Nasir al-Din led a jihad in Mauritania, drawing support from Berbers frustrated with the corruption of the region's Arab rulers.

The French colonial empire expanded into Mauritania by the 19th century. The West African jihads were brought to an end, following crackdowns by British and French colonists. In an effort to thwart militarism and threats of rebellion, French colonial administrators encouraged the influence of zaqiya, the religious tribes of Mauritania, over hassan, Mauritania's warrior tribes.

Post-independence 
The country declared its independence in 1960 and established itself as an Islamic Republic. Independence brought Moktar Ould Daddah into power, who promoted Islam during his rule. A military coup d'état ousted Daddah in 1978. Colonel Mohamed Khouna Ould Haidalla, one of the participants of the coup, became head of the government in 1980, and implemented Sharia law. President Maaouya Ould Sid'Ahmed Taya, successor of Ould Haidalla, reversed some of these changes, but was ousted in a military coup in 2005.

Political Islam, or Islamism, was introduced in the region during the 1970s. The instability that followed the coup that deposed Daddah invited elements of the Muslim Brotherhood, Wahabbism, and Tablighi Jamaat. The Islamists united as a political party in the 1980s, but were politically repressed starting in 1994. Government pressure on Islamist organizations continued throughout the 2000s. Funding by Saudi Arabia and other Gulf monarchies supported the establishment of Islamic schools, centers, and charities around the country, but were largely shut down by the government in 2003.  In 2005, Islamists were arrested and accused of terrorism. Of the original eighty arrested, eighteen remained in prison by 2006.

Denominations

Islam
Islam is by far the largest and most influential religion in the country, and has been since the 10th century. According to government census, 100% of the country's citizens are Muslim. Like much of North Africa, Mauritanians  follow the Maliki school of Islam.

Islam is the state religion, and sharia is used as the basis of judicial decisions. The five member High Council of Islam determines the compatibility of secular laws with Islamic laws.

Others

There are around 4,500 Roman Catholics in the country of foreign origin. There are also a few adherents of Judaism working in the country.

Government restrictions on religion
In Mauritania, religious and secular NGOs are granted tax exemption. Based on the sharia stance on apostasy, the government forbids converting Muslims to competing religions. The publication of religious materials that are not Islamic is restricted. Religious education is considered mandatory, but only makes up a small portion of the public school curriculum.

According to the Pew Research Center, although social conflict caused by religious hostilities is ranked Low in Mauritania, the amount of government restriction on the practice of religion is ranked High. Mauritania is the twelfth most religiously restrictive country in the world, ranked between Indonesia and Pakistan.

Literature 
 Muriel Devey, « Terre d'islam », in La Mauritanie, Éd. Karthala, Paris, 2005,  
 Sakho Mamadou Dickall, La littérature religieuse mauritanienne, s. l., 1986, 127 p.
 Paul Marty, Études sur l'Islam maure, E. Leroux, Paris, 1916, 252 p.

References

See also
Islam in Mauritania
Roman Catholicism in Mauritania
History of the Jews in Mauritania

 
Mauritanian culture
Society of Mauritania